Pransakha Vivekananda (2015) is a Bengali biographical novel written by Ranjan Bandyopadhyay. The book has 3 volumes. It was at the first position in Anandabazar Patrika'''s ten weekly popular books' list in October 2015.

 Plot 
The novel is based on the life of Swami Vivekananda. The books presents the eventful life of Vivekananda to the readers in form of a story, and not a mere biography.

 Publication 
The writing was started publishing in Bengal newspaper Sangbad Pratidin' weekly supplementary Chhuti'' and it continued for 2 and a half years. It was published in a bokk format by Patra Bharati in July 2015. Swami Purnatmananda, a monk of Ramakrishna Mission officially launched the book.

References 

2015 Indian novels
Bengali-language novels